Renzo Wifredo Pi Hugarte (Durazno, 23 November 1934 – Montevideo, 15 August 2012) was a Uruguayan scholar, anthropologist, professor, historian and writer. Together with Daniel Vidart he is considered one of the "founding fathers" of anthropology in Uruguay.

Works
 El Uruguay Indígena, Nuestra Tierra, Montevideo, 1969
 El legado de los inmigrantes (with Daniel Vidart), Nuestra Tierra, Montevideo, 1969-1970
 Los indios del Uruguay, 1973
 Los cultos de posesión en el Uruguay, Banda Oriental, 1995
 Historias de "aquella gente gandul" - Españoles y criollos vs. indios en la Banda Oriental, 1999

References

1934 births
2012 deaths
Uruguayan people of Catalan descent
Uruguayan people of Basque descent
People from Durazno Department
20th-century Uruguayan historians
Uruguayan male writers
Uruguayan anthropologists